Shifting Through the Breakers is the second studio album released by Canadian singer and songwriter Morgan Finlay.  It was released in 2007.

Track listing
 "(in)Security"
 "Merge"
 "Night at the Mercury"
 "Sound of Industry"
 "Bei dir sein"
 "I Meant to Get You Back"
 "Mourir d'envie"
 "Take the Edge off"
 "Mescaline"
 "Blessing and Burning"

References 

2007 albums